Radik Ramilyevich Yamlikhanov (born 30 January 1968) is a Russian professional football coach and a former player. He is an assistant coach with PFC CSKA Moscow.

Playing career
As a player, he made his professional debut in the Soviet Second League in 1988 for FC Iskra Smolensk. He played 5 games and scored 1 goal in the UEFA Intertoto Cup 1996 for FC Uralmash Yekaterinburg.

Personal life
His son Robert Yamlikhanov is a professional football player.

References

1968 births
People from Bashkortostan
Living people
Soviet footballers
Russian footballers
Russian Premier League players
FC Fakel Voronezh players
FC Ural Yekaterinburg players
Russian football managers
FC Naftovyk Okhtyrka managers
FC Fakel Voronezh managers
FC Metallurg Lipetsk players
Association football midfielders
Russian expatriate football managers
Expatriate football managers in Ukraine
Russian expatriate sportspeople in Ukraine
FC Neftekhimik Nizhnekamsk players
FC Iskra Smolensk players
Sportspeople from Bashkortostan